Suthichai Yoon (born November 24, 1946) is an Thai journalist, television personality, and author. He is the primary anchor of the Thai PBS news show and former CEO of Nation Multimedia Group, founder and Editorial director of The Nation and many other news channels in Thailand such as iTV and Nation TV.

Early life and family
Suthichai was born in a poor Chinese-Thai family in Hat Yai, Songkhla Province, the mother's name Suichan Sae-fung. He is the brother of Thepchai Yong. He completed the primary school from Saengthong Vitthaya School. Then went to Assumption Commercial College for Secondary school. While attending school, he also worked at the Bangkok Post newspaper and Siamrath Daily. He then furthered his education at the Faculty of Communication Arts, Chulalongkorn University While studying here, he also worked as a proofreading staff at Bangkok Post in 1968. It was not easy to balance work with study. Ultimately, he decided to drop out of college to fully focus on working instead. Then, he was promoted to be an Assistant head of news at Bangkok Post. Five months later, he was promoted to be the homeland news editor despite his the young age and without a college degree. Suthichai Yoon won the Sriburapha Award because he dared to make the news of Narong Kittikachorn broke the police fort because of drunkenness.

Career
Until 1971, Bangkok Post acquired the Bangkok World newspaper which he saw that it is a monopoly in the English newspaper industry. Therefore, together with ML Sunida Kitiyakara, Thammanoon Mahapaorayae and fellow journalists by selling shares to the public to raise funds until it was about 2 million baht in the establishment of the first English daily newspaper for the Thai people owning the name of The Voice of the Nation on 1 July 1971. In the year 1974, he worked with National Broadcasting Services of Thailand  and became famous from the news of the Persian Gulf War on the Channel 3. Later, when the 1976 coup happened on 6 October 1976, followed by the order to close all newspapers in Thailand Suthichai therefore brought the license that he had previously reserved issued a new newspaper called The Nation Review on 8 November 1976, then in the year 1985, changed to the name used until now as The Nation.

After the coup in Thailand in 2014, he was appointed as a member of the National Reform Committee on Mass Communication and Information technology in Prayut Chan-ocha government.

In 2018 Prime Minister Prayut Chan-ocha choose Suthichai served as a host for the press conference for Tham Luang cave rescue.

Personal life
Suttichai married with Nantawan Yoon, former editor of Lalana Magazine. They have a son, Prabda Yoon, the SEA Prize Writer of the Year 2002 and a daughter, Shimbun Yoon.

Master of Ceremony: MC

References

1946 births
Living people
Suthichai Yoon
Suthichai Yoon
Suthichai Yoon
Suthichai Yoon
Suthichai Yoon
Suthichai Yoon
Suthichai Yoon
Suthichai Yoon
Suthichai Yoon
Suthichai Yoon
21st-century pseudonymous writers